James Sánchez is an American politician. He was elected to the Connecticut House of Representatives in a special election to represent Connecticut's 6th House of Representatives district for the remainder of Edwin Vargas's term, who had resigned to work at Central Connecticut State University. He previously served on the Hartford city council. He is a member of the Democratic Party.

Political career
Sánchez was elected to the Hartford city council in 2015.

On January 3, 2023, Democrat Edwin Vargas resigned from representing Connecticut's 6th House of Representatives district to pursue an academic post at Central Connecticut State University. Vargas's resignation triggered a special election, which was held on February 28, 2023. Sánchez ran in the special election and defeated independent Jason Diaz, a firefighter, with 62.1% of the vote.

Electoral history

References

External links

Living people
Politicians from Hartford, Connecticut
Democratic Party members of the Connecticut House of Representatives
21st-century American politicians